From Coffee House to Concert Hall is a 1999 folk music album by Canadian folk singer Stan Rogers. It is a compilation album of live performances and studio recordings unreleased before Rogers's death in 1983. The last track, "Down the Road", was recorded live at McCabe's Guitar Shop five days before he died.

Track listing

References 

1999 live albums
Stan Rogers albums
Live albums published posthumously